The English River (French: "rivière des Anglais" in Canada) is a tributary of the Chateauguay River. This cross-border river between Canada and the United States crosses:
 Clinton County, in New York State, United States;
 Les Jardins-de-Napierville Regional County Municipality, including Hemmingford in Montérégie, in Quebec, Canada;
 Le Haut-Saint-Laurent Regional County Municipality, including the municipalities of Havelock, Saint-Chrysostome and Très-Saint-Sacrement, in Montérégie.

In the state of New York, the English River course is mainly served by Drown Road, White Road (east-west direction), Davison Road (east-west direction) and Blackman Corners Road (CR 16) (north direction -South). In Canada, the course of the English River is mainly served mainly by the route 203 (chemin du rang du Moulin, chemin du rang Sainte-Anne).

The river surface is generally frozen from mid-December to the end of March. Safe circulation on the ice is generally done from the end of December to the beginning of March. The water level of the river varies with the seasons and the precipitation.

Geography 

Forest and agricultural streams feed the head of the English river. Its course begins in Clinton County, New York state, near the intersection of Stone Road and Canaan Road.

  to the east, forming a curve to the south, and passing a short distance at the end of the segment in the Clinton Mooers Forest Preserve Detached Parcel, to Cannon Corners Road
  to the east along the Davison Road (passing on the north side), crossing the Lamberton Road (north-south direction), branching north-east along the Blackman Corners Road (CR16) (passing on the east side) and crossing the Scriver Road (east-west direction, up to the Canada-US border.

  north-west in Havelock, meandering through agricultural and forestry areas, up to Covey Hill road;
  in agricultural area first towards the north, the southwest by collecting the Giroux stream (coming from the northeast) by forming a big curve towards the south by collecting the Levi stream (coming from the south), then towards the northwest by collecting the Boilleau stream (coming from the southwest) and the Vincent river (coming from the east), up to the confluence of the Noire River (coming from the south), in the heart of the village of Saint-Chrystostome;
  in the agricultural zone to the north by collecting the Toynton stream (coming from the east), then the northwest by collecting the McKenzie-Chaloux stream (coming from the southwest), by collecting the Cloutier stream (coming from the northeast) and passing on the east side of the Aubrey hamlet, to the confluence of the Norton stream (coming from the East);

The English River generally flows north-west in an agricultural zone to go to flow on the south bank in a bend in the Châteauguay River, near the route 138. This confluence is located at:
  north of the village center of Howick;
  south-west of the Beauharnois Canal;
  north-west of the village center of Saint-Chrystome;
  south of the confluence of the Châteauguay River and lac Saint-Louis.

Toponymy 
In Clinton County (NY, USA), this river is designated "English River".

The toponym "Rivière des Anglais" was formalized on December 5, 1968 at the Commission de toponymie du Québec.

References

See also 

 Clinton County
 Les Jardins-de-Napierville Regional County Municipality
 Le Haut-Saint-Laurent Regional County Municipality
 Hemmingford, a municipality
 Havelock, a municipality
 Saint-Chrysostome, a municipality
 Très-Saint-Sacrement, a municipality
 Châteauguay River, a stream
 Noire River, a stream
 List of rivers of New York State
 List of rivers of Quebec
 Battle of the Chateauguay, a War of 1812 battle fought at the junction of the English River and the River Chateauguay

Rivers of Montérégie
Les Jardins-de-Napierville Regional County Municipality
Le Haut-Saint-Laurent Regional County Municipality
Rivers of New York (state)
Rivers of Clinton County, New York